Vaughan Williams and Tavener: Violin Works is the third studio album by Scottish violinist Nicola Benedetti.

Track listing
 "The Lark Ascending" - 15:57
 "Song for Athene" – 6:47
 "Dhyana" – 6:15
 "Lalishri - Introduction" – 1:48
 "Lalishri - Cycle 1" – 6:19
 "Lalishri - Cycle 2" - 5:39
 "Lalishri - Cycle 3" – 9:39
 "Lalishri - Cycle 4" – 11:09

References

2007 classical albums
Nicola Benedetti albums